Royal Air Force Killadeas or more simply RAF Killadeas is a former Royal Air Force station located  southwest of Irvinestown, County Fermanagh, Northern Ireland and  northwest of Enniskillen, County Fermanagh.

History

The following units were based here at some point:

 No. 131 (Coastal) Operation Training Unit RAF (July 1942 - June 1945)
 No. 240 Squadron RAF
 No. 272 Maintenance Unit RAF (August 1945 - February 1947)
 No. 302 Ferry Training Unit RAF (April - July 1945)
 Coastal Command Flying Instructors School RAF (1945)

Current use
The site is now used as the Lough Erne Yacht Club.

References

Citations

Bibliography

Military installations established in 1941
Military installations closed in 1947
Royal Air Force stations in Northern Ireland
Buildings and structures in County Fermanagh
Military history of County Fermanagh
World War II sites in Northern Ireland
Royal Air Force stations of World War II in the United Kingdom